KCIU-LP (91.1 FM) is a radio station broadcasting a religious broadcasting format. Licensed to Lawrence, Kansas, United States, the station is currently owned by Lawrence Chinese Evangelical Church.

On October 10, 2012, KCIU-LP changed frequency from 103.7 MHz to 101.7 MHz, and then to 91.1 MHz on December 15, 2014.

References

External links
 

CIU-LP
Radio stations established in 2003
CIU-LP
Lawrence, Kansas
Asian-American culture in Kansas